The Pink Panther is a 2006 American comedy-mystery film and a reboot of The Pink Panther franchise, marking the tenth installment in the series. It is also the first Pink Panther film to be released since Son of the Pink Panther released in 1993. In this film, Inspector Jacques Clouseau is assigned to solve the murder of a famous football coach and the theft of the famous Pink Panther diamond. The film was directed by Shawn Levy, stars Steve Martin as Clouseau and also co-stars Kevin Kline, Jean Reno, Emily Mortimer, and Beyoncé Knowles.

The film received mostly negative reviews but was a commercial success, earning $164million worldwide. The Pink Panther was released theatrically on February 10, 2006, and was released on DVD and Blu-ray on June 13, 2006. A sequel was released on February 6, 2009.

Plot
At a football match between France and China, France coach Yves Gluant arrives wearing the priceless Pink Panther diamond ring and embraces his girlfriend, pop star Xania. After France wins in sudden death, Gluant is killed by a poison dart, with the Pink Panther nowhere to be found. Eager to win the Légion d'honneur, Chief Inspector Charles Dreyfus promotes clumsy policeman and village idiot Jacques Clouseau to the rank of inspector and assigns him to the case. While Clouseau draws the media's attention, Dreyfus assembles a secret team to actually crack the case and assigns Gendarme Gilbert Ponton to keep an eye on Clouseau. Clouseau befriends Ponton and falls in love with secretary Nicole Durant.

Although Clouseau makes little progress in the case, due to his clumsiness, he still discovers that many people hated Gluant and even wanted to kill him. Bizu, a France player who blamed Gluant for "stealing away" Xania, is the prime murder suspect until he is shot in the head in the team's locker room. While gathering information at a casino, Clouseau meets MI6 006 agent Nigel Boswell, who foils a robbery while wearing Clouseau's trench coat; Clouseau mistakenly receives credit (as Nigel wasn't supposed to be around) and is nominated for the Légion d'honneur, angering Dreyfus and ruining his intentions and chances to win the Légion d'honneur. After following Xania to New York City, Ponton insists she is a suspect because Gluant cheated on her, but Clouseau believes she is innocent, though her actions cause him to believe she knows more than she is letting on. The poison that killed Gluant is found to have been derived from Chinese herbs, leading Dreyfus to conclude that the killer is a Chinese envoy named Dr. Pang, whom Gluant had several dealings with. Dreyfus has Clouseau's bag swapped for one full of weapons at the airport, and Clouseau is arrested (primarily due to his inability to say "hamburger" correctly, having attempted to smuggle some onto the flight back) and vilified by the press on his return to France. Dreyfus demotes Clouseau and plots to publicly arrest Dr. Pang at the Presidential Ball, where Xania will perform.

Clouseau sees an article online about his arrest and notices something in the picture that makes him deduce that Gluant and Bizu were killed by the same person. Realizing that Xania will be the killer's next target, Clouseau, Ponton and Nicole hurry to the Élysée Palace and sneak into the Presidential Ball. While Dreyfus errantly arrests Dr. Pang, Clouseau and Ponton save Xania's life by capturing her would-be assassin: Yuri, the France team's trainer. Jealous and feeling overlooked for the team's success, Yuri used his mandated knowledge of Chinese herbs to kill Gluant; he jabbed the dart unseen into Gluant's neck during their celebration, making it look like Gluant had been shot with it. He later killed Bizu, who long suspected that Yuri might try to kill Gluant and attempted to blackmail him, by using his Russian army training to target the player's occipital lobe, and then targeted Xania for ignoring him and dating Gluant. Clouseau reveals that the Pink Panther was not stolen but instead sewn into the lining of Xania's purse; the photograph of Clouseau's arrest showed an X-ray of the purse at airport security. Xania confesses that Gluant gave her the diamond as an engagement ring just before the France-China match, but after his murder, she was worried that the public would assume she was responsible if she came forward with the ring. Clouseau concludes that Xania is the ring's rightful owner, and Yuri is taken into custody.

Clouseau wins the Légion d'honneur which disappoints Dreyfus. Leaving the ceremony, Dreyfus' suit accidentally gets caught in Clouseau's car door, causing Dreyfus to be dragged down the street as an oblivious Clouseau drives away. While visiting a gravely injured Dreyfus in the hospital and accidentally and unintentionally annoying him, Clouseau accidentally releases the brake on Dreyfus' bed, which rolls through the hospital and crashes the irate chief inspector towards a window, throwing him down into the Seine as he screams Clouseau's name, while Clouseau, Ponton, and Nicole watch from inside.

Cast
Steve Martin as Inspector Jacques Clouseau, a bumbling police officer from a small village in France, assigned to bring Yves Gluant's murderer to justice and recover the Pink Panther diamond
Kevin Kline as Chief Inspector Charles Dreyfus, the head of the French police who is obsessed with winning the Medal of Honour, and means to use Clouseau and the Pink Panther case to win it
Jean Reno as Gendarme Gilbert Ponton, a capable police officer who is assigned to report to Dreyfus on Clouseau's actions
Emily Mortimer as Nicole Durant, a secretary and romantic interest of Clouseau
Henry Czerny as Yuri, a Russian trainer for the France national football team
Kristin Chenoweth as Cherie, an American employee of the France national football team
Roger Rees as Raymond Laroque, a wealthy casino owner and friend of Yves Gluant
Beyoncé as Xania, a famous pop star and girlfriend of Gluant
William Abadie as Bizu, a player on the France national football team
Scott Adkins as Jacquard, another player on the France national football team
Philip Goodwin as Deputy Chief Renard
Henri Garcin as President
Jean Dell as Justice Minister Clochard
Anna Katarina as Agent Corbeille
Jason Statham as Yves Gluant (uncredited), the head coach of the France national football team, whose murder and vanishing of his Pink Panther diamond serve as the main conflicts of the plot
Clive Owen as Nigel Boswell/Agent 006 (uncredited), an MI6 secret agent who briefly helps Clouseau
Boris McGiver as Vainqueur (uncredited), the current head coach of the France national football team who takes over after the murder of Gluant

Production
Chris Tucker and Mike Myers were considered for the role of Inspector Jacques Clouseau. A collaboration between Steve Martin and producer Robert Simonds, who had worked together on Cheaper by the Dozen, The Pink Panther had a production budget of US$80million. Filming began on May 10, 2004.

The film was originally supposed to seek an August 5, 2005 release date, but was then pushed back to February 10, 2006, after Sony expressed dissatisfaction with the film's raunchy tone. It was heavily edited and key scenes were re-shot in an effort to create a more family-friendly feature. "With the recent acquisition of MGM, we wanted to give our marketing department the time and opportunity to launch this very important franchise," Sony Pictures Releasing president Rory Bruer said. "We've seen the movie, and we really love this film. It's a franchise we believe in and are really excited about, and Steve Martin is great as Clouseau."

In keeping with the original Pink Panther films, this film features animated opening titles, provided by Kurtz & Friends.

Reception

Critical response
On Rotten Tomatoes, The Pink Panther has an approval rating of 21% based on 143 reviews and an average rating of 4.1/10. The site's critical consensus reads: "Though Steve Martin is game, the particulars of the Inspector Clouseau character elude him in this middling update." On Metacritic, the film has a weighted average score of 38 out of 100 based on 35 critics, indicating "generally unfavorable reviews". Audiences polled by CinemaScore gave the film an average grade of "B" on an A+ to F scale.

The film was nominated for two Razzies in 2006, one in the category "Worst Remake or Rip-off", and one in the category "Worst Supporting Actress" for Kristin Chenoweth. At the 2006 Stinkers Bad Movie Awards, the film received four nominations: "Worst Actor" (Martin), "Worst Song" (Check on It), and "Worst Fake Accent (Male)" (both Martin and Kline).

Box office
The film grossed $164.1million against a budget of $80million. The Pink Panther is the highest-grossing film in the Pink Panther franchise.

The Pink Panther opened at No.1 in the United States, grossing $20.2million from 3,477 theaters, and took in an additional $20.9million over the four day Presidents Day weekend the following weekend. The film closed in theatres on April 16, having grossed $82.2million in its ten weeks of release. Overseas, the film took $76.6million. United States screenings made up 51.8% of box office takings, with international viewings responsible for 48.2%. In the United Kingdom, the film was released on March 17, 2006, and topped the country's box office that weekend.

Home media
The Pink Panther was released on DVD and Blu-ray on June 13, 2006, and sold 693,588 DVD copies, worth $9,391,182. To date the film has sold 1,579,116 copies—$23,216,770 of consumer spending.

Music
David Newman was originally chosen to compose the score for the film, but was quickly replaced by Christophe Beck. He is credited with the film score which was released as the soundtrack album The Pink Panther about one month following the release of the film. R&B singer, Beyoncé, who co-stars as Xania, performed two songs for the film, "A Woman Like Me" and  hit, "Check on It". The latter serves as the film's theme song aside from the Pink Panther theme by Henry Mancini.

Numerous other songs were used in small parts, but only Beck's original score was included on the soundtrack album.

Sequel

The sequel to this film, titled The Pink Panther 2, was released on February 6, 2009. Martin, Mortimer, and Reno reprised their roles as Inspector Clouseau, Nicole, and Ponton respectively, while John Cleese replaced Kline as Chief Inspector Dreyfus; other new additions to the cast included Andy Garcia, Alfred Molina, Lily Tomlin, and Jeremy Irons. The film received worse reviews than its predecessor and was also not as commercially successful, grossing only $75,946,615 at the box office.

References

External links

 
 
 
 

2000s English-language films
2000s adventure comedy films
2000s comedy mystery films
2000s heist films
2000s police comedy films
2006 films
2006 comedy films
20th Century Fox films
American adventure comedy films
American comedy mystery films
American crime comedy films
American films with live action and animation
American heist films
American slapstick comedy films
Columbia Pictures films
Films directed by Shawn Levy
Films produced by Robert Simonds
Films scored by Christophe Beck
Films set in New York City
Films set in Paris
Films shot in Los Angeles County, California
Films shot in New York City
Films shot in Paris
Films shot in Prague
Films shot in Rome
Films shot in Vancouver
Films with screenplays by Steve Martin
Metro-Goldwyn-Mayer films
Reboot films
The Pink Panther films
2000s American films
2000s British films